A bipolar junction transistor is a type of transistor that uses both electrons and holes as charge carriers.

BJT may also refer to:
 Balanta language (ISO 639: bjt), an Atlantic-Congo language of West Africa
 Beijing Time, another name for China Standard Time
 Bentota River Airport (IATA: BJT), Sri Lanka
 Bhumjaithai Party, a Thai political party
 Business Japanese Proficiency Test, a test of practical communicative ability in Japanese